Holworthy Hall, in Harvard Yard, Cambridge, Massachusetts, is a historic dormitory for first-year students at Harvard College.

History

Holworthy was named in 1812 in honor of a wealthy English merchant, Sir Matthew Holworthy, who died in 1678 having bequeathed £1,000 to Harvard — then the largest donation in the college's history — "for the promotion of learning and the promulgation of the Gospel" in Cambridge.  When it opened on August 18, 1812, then-President John Thornton Kirkland of Harvard referred to it as "Holworthy College."  It did not have indoor plumbing; for almost a century, students had to go outside to use the college's pump.  Rent was $26 per year.

Until 1860, Room 24 served as the library of Harvard's chapter of the Phi Beta Kappa Society and also housed the librarian, who kept the chapter's several hundred books in his study closet.

The dorm was originally used for all classes, as evidenced by famous residents like Thomas Bulfinch and Horatio Alger being housed in it multiple times, but was predominantly used for housing seniors during its early existence.  By the turn of the 20th century, the senior classes expressed a desire to formally make the oldest Yard buildings — first Holworthy, then Hollis and Stoughton — their own and petitioned the college administration to make Holworthy a senior-only dormitory.  By the hundredth anniversary of the dorm in 1912, about 1,300 men had lived in Holworthy.

By 1904, Holworthy was fully a senior dorm.  Although it was not considered as fashionable as some of the newer dorms, Holworthy and its neighbors on the Yard became the center of student life on campus.  It also became known for housing many of the most prominent students within the college's social life, including athletic team captains and managers, Lampoon presidents (including Robert Benchley '12, who spoke at Holworthy's centennial dinner), Advocate presidents, and the leaders of the college's various musical groups.  By the 1910s, the New York Times reported that Holworthy's "record of men afterward illustrious who have occupied its rooms is probably longer than any similar list possessed by any other college building," making it the "pet" dorm of seniors.

With the other freshman dormitories in the Yard, Holworthy joined the Harvard–Yale sister colleges arrangement in 2005, when Harvard's freshman dormitories — which are not otherwise formally affiliated with Harvard's residential houses — became associated with Harvard houses and their counterparts among Yale University's residential colleges.  Holworthy was paired with Hollis Hall to become part of Winthrop House's affiliation with Davenport College at Yale.

Past residents
Holworthy is notable for having been the freshman dorm of several writers and producers of The Simpsons who graduated in the 1980s — Al Jean '81, Bill Oakley '88, Conan O'Brien '85, and Mike Reiss '81.  O'Brien referenced his time in Holworthy during his Class Day speech to the Harvard Class of 2000.

 Henry Adams, journalist and novelist, Room 5
 James Barr Ames, former Harvard Law School dean, Rooms 14 and 20
 Horatio Alger, novelist, Rooms 07, 18, and 24
 George Bancroft, statesman and historian, Room 24
 Robert Benchley, humorist and actor, Room 23
 Thomas Bulfinch, writer and mythographer, Rooms 09 and 16
 Joseph Hodges Choate, lawyer and diplomat, Room 21
 William Gardner Choate, judge and Choate School founder, Room 21
 Adam Clymer, journalist, Room 18
 Richard Henry Dana, Jr., lawyer and politician, Room 13
 Charles William Eliot, former Harvard president, Room 11
 Robert Grant, novelist, Room 9
 Christian Herter, politician, Room 15
 David Halberstam, journalist, Room 19
 Holworthy Hall, pseudonym of writer H. E. Porter, editor of Lampoon, Room 13
 Steve Hely, television writer, Room 21
 Al Jean, television writer and producer, Room 17
 Edward Lawrence Logan, politician and namesake of Boston Logan International Airport, Room 6
 Samuel Longfellow, clergyman, Room 14
 Percival Lowell, astronomer and businessman, Room 21
 Edward Sandford Martin, Lampoon co-founder and Life founder, Room 4
 James Murdoch, media executive, Room 7
 B. J. Novak, actor and television writer, Room 10
 Bill Oakley, television writer and producer, Room 15
 Conan O'Brien, talk show host and comedy writer, Room 16
 Deval Patrick, politician
 Wendell Phillips, abolitionist and orator, Room 24

 Josiah Quincy, Jr., politician, Room 7
 Mike Reiss, television writer and producer, Room 20
 William E. Russell, politician, Room 7
 Steven V. Roberts, journalist, Room 14
 Charles Sumner, politician, Room 23
 Pablo S. Torre, sportswriter, Room 18
 Luis Ubiñas, Ford Foundation president, Room 16
 Cornel West, philosopher and activist, Room 8
 Robert Wrenn, Hall of Fame tennis player, Room 3
 Jeffrey Zucker, media executive, Room 7
 Pete Buttigieg, politician
 Priscilla Chan, philanthropist and pediatrician, Room 24

References

External links

 Harvard University Office of Residential Life
 Harvard College Freshman Dean's Office
 Harvard Freshman Dorms: Ivy Yard

Harvard Freshman Dormitories
1812 establishments in Massachusetts